The 1976–77 Kansas Jayhawks men's basketball team represented the University of Kansas during the 1976–77 NCAA Division I men's basketball season.

Roster
John Douglas
Herb Nobles
Ken Koenigs
Clint Johnson
Donnie Von Moore
Hasan Houston
Paul Mokeski
Milt Gibson
Brad Sanders
Chris Barnthouse
Mac Stallcup
Scott Anderson
Dave Preston
Tom Paget

Schedule

References

Kansas Jayhawks men's basketball seasons
Kansas Jay
Kansas Jay